Schweinfurth may refer to:

People 
Albert C. Schweinfurth, American architect
Charles F. Schweinfurth, American architect
Georg August Schweinfurth (1836-1925) Baltic German botanist and ethnologist
Julius A. Schweinfurth, American architect
George Furth (né Schweinfurth)  American librettist, playwright, and actor

Places 
 , a former municipality in northern Saxony, now part of Gröditz
 Schweinfurt, a city in the Lower Franconia region of Bavaria in Germany, sometimes spelled Schweinfurth in older literature

See also